Kano State Polytechnic is a Nigerian Tertiary Institution located in Kano, North-Western Nigeria. Established in 1975, which is regulated by the National Board for Technical Education (NBTE) the polytechnic is made up of five schools(faculties) : School of Technology, School of Management Studies, School of Environmental Studies, School of Rural Technology and Entrepreneurship Development, School of General Studies.

Library

Schools/Departments 
SCHOOLS

 School of Technology
 School of Management Studies
 School of Environmental Studies
 School of Rural Technology and Entrepreneurship Development, 
 School of General Studies
 School of Informatics

DEPARTMENTS

 Department of Art and Industrial Design
 Department of Computer Science
 Department of Computer Engineering
 Department of Civil Engineering
 Department of Electrical Engineering
 Department of Fashion and Textile 
 Department of Hospitality Management 
 Department of Mechanical Engineering
 Department of Pharmaceutical Technology 
 Department of Printing Technology
 Department of Science Laboratory Technology
 Department of Statistics
 Department of Physical Science
 Department of Life Science
 Department of Technical Education
 Department of Mechatronic Engineering
 Department of Leisure and Tourism
 Department of Welding and Fabrication
 Department of Accountancy
 Department of Banking and Finance
 Department of Business Administration and Management
 Department of Public Administration
 Department of Cooperative and Economic Management
 Department of Procurement and Supply Chain Management
 Department of Office Technology Management
 Department of Marketing
 Department of Architecture
 Department of Building Technology
 Department of Estate Management
 Department of Land Surveying and Geo-informatics
 Department of Quantity Surveying
 Department of Urban and Regional Planning 
 Department of Library and Information Sciences
 Department of Mass Communication
 Department of Arts and Humanities
 Department of Social Development
 Department of Community and Adult Education
 Department of Local Government Studies
 Department of Home and Rural Economics

The Central Administration is the heart of the school where administrative issues of the school are carried out and it is located along Bayero University, Kano (BUK) Road.

On 20 July 2020, Kano State Polytechnic presented two automatic handwashing machines constructed by its staff and students to the Kano State Government.

References

Buildings and structures in Kano
Educational institutions established in 1975
1975 establishments in Nigeria
Universities and colleges in Kano State
Education in Kano
Polytechnics in Nigeria
Public universities in Nigeria